Compton Dundon is a village and civil parish in Somerset, England, lying beside King's Sedgemoor and the Polden Hills,  south of Glastonbury and  north of Somerton in the South Somerset district.  The village has a population of 705. The parish includes the small village of Dundon and the hamlet of Littleton.

History
Just outside the village is Dundon Hill (or Dundon Camp), an Iron Age hill fort, with 2 m (6.5 ft) ramparts.  An excavation in 1916 found pottery and flints here, but the fort has been damaged by quarrying.

The manor was owned by Glastonbury Abbey at the time of the Domesday Book in 1086. The parish of Compton Dundon was part of the Whitley Hundred.

Paul Kemp-King writes in an unpublished manuscript that it is almost certain that there was once a bell foundry in the village, although its exact location is uncertain. Bells cast in Compton Dundon can be found in nearby villages: Somerton (a 1661 bell) and Aller (bells cast in 1638, 1640, and 1663 by Robert Austen), for example. Kemp-King writes that the difficulty of transporting the heavy bells by horse and cart made local casting by itinerant bell-founders desirable.

Within the parish is the Admiral Hood Monument celebrating Admiral Sir Samuel Hood. It has been designated by English Heritage as a Grade II* listed building.

Governance
The parish council has responsibility for local issues, including setting an annual precept (local rate) to cover the council's operating costs and producing annual accounts for public scrutiny. The parish council evaluates local planning applications and works with the local police, district council officers, and neighbourhood watch groups on matters of crime, security, and traffic. The parish council's role also includes initiating projects for the maintenance and repair of parish facilities, as well as consulting with the district council on the maintenance, repair, and improvement of highways, drainage, footpaths, public transport, and street cleaning. Conservation matters (including trees and listed buildings) and environmental issues are also the responsibility of the council.

The village falls within the Non-metropolitan district of South Somerset, which was formed on 1 April 1974 under the Local Government Act 1972, having previously been part of Langport Rural District. The district council is responsible for local planning and building control, local roads, council housing, environmental health, markets and fairs, refuse collection and recycling, cemeteries and crematoria, leisure services, parks, and tourism. Compton Dundon falls within the electoral ward of Wessex.

Somerset County Council is responsible for running the largest and most expensive local services such as education, social services, libraries, main roads, public transport, policing and fire services, trading standards, waste disposal and strategic planning.

It is also part of the Somerton and Frome county constituency represented in the House of Commons of the Parliament of the United Kingdom. It elects one Member of Parliament (MP) by the first past the post system of election, and was part of the South West England constituency of the European Parliament prior to Britain leaving the European Union in January 2020, which elected seven MEPs using the d'Hondt method of party-list proportional representation.

Geography

At the central crossroads is the remains of a 14th-century wayside cross.

Just south of the village is Great Breach and Copley Woods, a biological Site of Special Scientific Interest which is a Nature Conservation Review Woodland Site, owned and managed by the Somerset Wildlife Trust. The site consists of ancient and semi-natural broadleaved woodland. Two woodland types with a restricted distribution in Britain occur and the site supports a locally important invertebrate fauna.

Religious sites

The parish Church of St Andrew, at Dundon, dates from the 14th century and has been designated by English Heritage as a Grade II* listed building.

Gallery

References

External links

Compton Dundon and Littleton parish website

Villages in South Somerset
Hill forts in Somerset
Civil parishes in Somerset